The 2015 Mexico City Grand Prix was the last grand prix tournament of the 2015 BWF Grand Prix Gold and Grand Prix calendar. The tournament was held in Mexico City, Mexico from December 15 until December 20, 2015 and had a total purse of US$50,000.

Men's singles

Seeds

 Ajay Jayaram (quarterfinals)
 Sho Sasaki (semifinals)
 Lee Dong-keun (champion)
 Boonsak Ponsana (second round)

Finals

Section 1

Section 2

Section 3

Section 4

Women's singles

Seeds

 Nozomi Okuhara (Withdrew)
 Bae Yeon-ju (Flnals)
 Michelle Li (first round)
 Busanan Ongbumrungpan (third round)

Finals

Top Half

Bottom Half

Men's doubles

Seeds
  Vladimir Ivanov / Ivan Sozonov (Withdrew)
  Goh V Shem / Tan Wee Kiong (semi-final)
  Manu Attri / B. Sumeeth Reddy (champion)
  Marcus Ellis / Chris Langridge

Finals

Top Half

Bottom Half

Women's doubles

Seeds
  Vivian Hoo Kah Mun / Woon Khe Wei
  Chang Ye-na / Lee So-hee
  Naoko Fukuman / Kurumi Yonao
  Go Ah-ra / Yoo Hae-won

Finals

Top Half

Bottom Half

Mixed doubles

Seeds
  Michael Fuchs / Birgit Michels
  Chan Peng Soon / Goh Liu Ying (champion)
  Danny Bawa Chrisnanta / Vanessa Neo Yu Yan
  Choi Sol-kyu / Eom Hye-won

Finals

Top Half

Bottom Half

References 

Mexico City Grand Prix
BWF Grand Prix Gold and Grand Prix